Ahluwalia may refer to:

 Ahluwalia (misl)
 Ahluwalia (surname)
 Ahluwalia (caste)